Martin Henriksen (born 5 January 1979) is a Norwegian politician.

He was born in Trondheim and grew up in Harstad. From 2006 to 2010 he chaired the Workers' Youth League. He serves as a deputy representative to the Parliament of Norway from Troms during the term 2009–2013. In May 2011 he was appointed as a political adviser in the Ministry of Fisheries and Coastal Affairs, as a part of Stoltenberg's Second Cabinet.

References

1979 births
Living people
Politicians from Trondheim
People from Harstad
Labour Party (Norway) politicians
Troms politicians
Deputy members of the Storting
21st-century Norwegian politicians